Claudette Mink (born April 4, 1971) is a Canadian actress.

Education
She is a graduate of George Brown Theatre School.

Filmography

Film

Television

External links 

 
 Claudette Mink at FEARnet

1971 births
Actresses from Toronto
Canadian film actresses
Canadian stage actresses
Canadian television actresses
Living people